Xianju National Park is a national park in Xianju County, Zhejiang, China. It lies between the Kuocang Mountains and Dalei Mountain in southeastern Zhejiang province. It shrouded by the cloud and mist all the year around.

Name
Xianju has magnificent springs, waterfalls, cliffs and valleys, as well as layer upon layer of peaks immersed in mist.  As a splendid work of nature, the beautiful place is just like a fairland on earth, so local people call it "Xianju", meaning a residence where the immortals live.

Natural history
The volcanic rock landform of Xianju National Park was shaped 120 million years ago. With the Pacific Plate diving beneath the Eurasia Plate, volcanoes in the coastal area of southeastern China erupted on a large scale. Between two eruptions, there wasn't new lava reaching the crater. Thus, in the weathering process, the crater gradually collapsed into a bowl-shaped pit and then became a lake with more and more water retained in it. After that, volcanoes got active and volcanic rock started to build up again. The volcanic eruptions brought very thick layers of volcanic rock. In the later stage, the earth's crust rose and the exposed earth's surface was eroded. With the increase in the erosion degree, the earth's surface became a combination of various geomorphic types, including scabland, screen-shaped cliffs, door-shaped rock, pillar peaks and so on.

In June 1924, Ren-Chang Ching found longleaf torreya in Xianju. He collected a specimen and took it to the Arnold Arboretum of Harvard University in the United States. In 1925 he named the tree after his academic supervisor, John George Jack.

In March 2014, it began to build a national park and completed in November 2015.

Geology
In the park, there is the most typical and complete geomorphic system of rhyolitic mountainous land. In terms of volcanic geology and petrology, the region is of great scientific value. The volcanic rock is acidic in the park. Its silicon dioxide content is over 66%.

The park has 101 major geological relics and 24 water views. In the geomorphic landscape of Xianju National Park, Fanzheng Rock is one of the iconic pillar peaks. Its flat top like a huge steamer, the mist hazing the peak, is just like the steam coming from the rice steamer, that's why the peak is called Fanzheng Rock.

Fauna and Flora
The park is designated as a wildlife preserve. There are strict regulations on the rocks, plants, animals and birds from the park. It has a forest coverage rate of over 93%. The park has well-preserved evergreen broad-leaved forests.

Within the boundaries of the park, the following number of species are known to live: 322 species of vertebrates (of them, there are 26 species under class II national protection, such as pangolin, long-tailed goral, reeves, sumatran serow, black muntjac, silver pheasant, masked palm civet and wild boar), 1,505 species of vascular plants (of them, there are 14 species under class I and II national protection, such as Taxus chinensis var. mairei and longleaf torreya), 57 species of ferns, 18 species of gymnosperms, and 1,365 species of angiosperms.

River

Culture
In October 2018, Xianju National Park served as a shooting location for the CCTV travel documentary series Homeland, Dreamland.

See also
 List of national parks of China

References

External links
 
 

National parks of China
Protected areas established in 2015
Tourist attractions in Taizhou, Zhejiang
Geography of Zhejiang
2015 establishments in China